Ironton is the name of several places in the United States:

Ironton, Arkansas
Ironton, Colorado
Ironton, Indiana
Ironton, Louisiana
Ironton, Michigan
Ironton, Minnesota
Ironton, Missouri
Ironton, Montana
Ironton, New York
Ironton, Ohio
Ironton Junction, Ohio
Ironton, Pennsylvania
Ironton, Texas
Ironton, Utah
Ironton, Wisconsin:
Ironton, Wisconsin
Ironton (town), Wisconsin
Oxmoor, Alabama, also known as Ironton
Ironton Creek in Crow Wing County, Minnesota
Ironton Flats in Madera County, California
Ironton Hollow in Iron County, Missouri
Ironton Ridge in Reynolds County, Missouri
Irontone Springs in Otsego County, Michigan